Nancy Joy Baluch  (10 October 1932 – 14 May 2013) was an Australian politician who served as Mayor of Port Augusta from 1981 to 1993 and from 1995 until her death. Her term as mayor of 29 years is believed to be an Australian record.

Baluch was born in Port Augusta to George Budgen Copley and Jessie Stuart Copley, née Parker. She attended Cook and Port Augusta Primary Schools and Port Augusta High School. She married Teofil Stefan Baluch, a Ukrainian who had been imprisoned in Dachau concentration camp in World War II, in 1954. She worked as head stenographer for the Mechanical Engineering Branch of Commonwealth Railways between 1949 and 1953, and was owner/proprietor of a motel from 1961 to 1981. She was elected to Port Augusta City Council in 1970.

Baluch became involved in local politics after her son, a severe asthmatic, was born and she became a campaigner for improved health services. After becoming mayor in 1981, she led the successful effort to ban drinking in public places in Port Augusta. She also came to public notice when she imposed a night-time curfew on the citizens of the town in order to reduce violence. She stood as the Liberal candidate for Grey at the 1983 Australian federal election.

Her husband died 16 years before she did, of lung cancer.  As he did not smoke, it was attributed to the power stations where he worked. Baluch campaigned for solar-thermal technology to replace coal-fired power.

She died, still the serving mayor, on 14 May 2013 after a long period with breast cancer.

Honours
Joy Baluch was awarded the Centenary Medal in 2001.

She was appointed a Member of the Order of Australia in 2007 "for service to local government in South Australia, particularly through contributions to economic and regional development, and to the community of Port Augusta and region".

The Joy Baluch AM Bridge over the Spencer Gulf is named in her honour.

Baluch starred in a documentary by Dick Smith called Ten Bucks a Litre, released on 1 August 2013, which included a dedication towards her at the end.

References

1932 births
2013 deaths
Mayors of places in South Australia
Members of the Order of Australia
Recipients of the Centenary Medal
South Australian local councillors
Women mayors of places in South Australia
People from Port Augusta
Women local councillors in Australia